The 1886 United States elections occurred in the middle of Democratic President Grover Cleveland's term, during the Third Party System. Members of the 50th United States Congress were chosen in this election. Democrats retained control of the House, while Republicans retained control of the Senate.

In the House, Republicans won a moderate number of seats, but Democrats retained a narrow majority. In the Senate, Democrats won a moderate number of seats, but Republicans retained a narrow majority.

See also
1886 United States House of Representatives elections
1886–87 United States Senate elections

References

1886 elections in the United States
1886
United States midterm elections